A threat is a communication of intent to inflict harm or loss on another person. Intimidation is a tactic used between conflicting parties to make the other timid or psychologically insecure for coercion or control. The act of intimidation for coercion is considered as a threat.

Threatening or  threatening behavior (or criminal threatening behavior) is the crime of intentionally or knowingly putting another person in fear of bodily injury. "Threat of harm generally involves a perception of injury...physical or mental damage...act or instance of injury, or a material and detriment or loss to a person."

Some of the more common types of threats forbidden by law are those made with an intent to obtain a monetary advantage or to compel a person to act against their will. In most US states, it is an offense to threaten to (1) use a deadly weapon on another person; (2) injure another's person or property; or (3) injure another's reputation.

Law

Brazil
In Brazil, the crime of threatening someone, defined as a threat to cause unjust and grave harm, is punishable by a fine or three months to one year in prison, as described in the Brazilian Penal Code, article 147. Brazilian [jurisprudence] does not treat as a crime a threat that was proffered in a heated discussion.

Germany
The German Strafgesetzbuch § 241 punishes the crime of threat with a prison term for up to three years or a fine. Even if someone, against his better judgment, feigns to another person that the realization of a serious criminal offense directed against him or a person close to him is imminent, shall be similarly punished.

United States
In the United States, federal law criminalizes certain true threats transmitted via the U.S. mail or in interstate commerce. It also criminalizes threatening the government officials of the United States. Some U.S. states criminalize cyberbullying. Threats of bodily harm are considered assault.

State of Texas
In the state of Texas, it is not necessary that the person threatened actually perceive a threat for a threat to exist for legal purposes.

True threat 

A true threat is a threatening communication that can be prosecuted under the law. It is distinct from a threat that is made in jest. The U.S. Supreme Court has held that true threats are not protected under the U.S. Constitution based on three justifications: preventing fear, preventing the disruption that follows from that fear, and diminishing the likelihood that the threatened violence will occur.

See also

References

Bullying
Speech crimes
Psychological abuse